Marampudi Joji (7 October 1942 – 27 August 2010) was the third Archbishop of Hyderabad. He was born in Bhimavaram and died at the Bishop's House, Hyderabad, Andhra Pradesh. He knew Latin, Telugu, and  English.

Early years & education
Joji was educated at the Lutheran Boarding School in Peddapuram near Samalkot which is managed by the Priests of the Andhra Evangelical Lutheran Church (AELC).

Ordination & Pastorship
Joji was ordained a priest on 14 December 1971 in the diocese of Vijayawada.  Joji was privileged to have received Blessed Mother Teresa when she went to Vijayawada to initiate the work of the Missionaries of Charity.

Bishopric

Diocese of Khammam
On 21 December 1991, he was appointed the Bishop of Khammam and consecrated on 19 March 1992. He served until 8 November 1996 when he was transferred to the Diocese of Vijayawada.

Diocese of Vijayawada
Bishop Joji became the Bishop of Vijayawada on 8 November 1996.  However, he took charge of the diocese only on 19 January 1997.

Archbishop of Hyderabad

On 29 January 2000, he was appointed the Archbishop of Hyderabad.  He was installed by Archbishop Giorgio Zur in the presence of his predecessor Archbishop S. Arulappa and of Bishop Joseph S. Thumma on 30 April 2000.

Joji inaugurated the Hyderabad session of the scholarly Church History Association of India incorporating Church Historians of the Pentecostal, Protestant, Orthodox, and Catholic traditions.

Archbishop Joji was known for his able administration.  He seemed to have headed the Diocese of Vijayawada's Social Service Society before being elevated to the Bishopric of Khammam.

The Archbishop has principally consecrated three Bishops of Andhra Pradesh:
 Bishop of Kurnool, Most Rev. P. Anthony (19 April 2008) 
 Bishop of Cuddapah, Most Rev. G. Prasad (1 March 2008)
 Bishop of Nellore, Most Rev. D. M. Prakasam (17 January 2007)

See also

Telugu Christian
B. P. Sugandhar, Bishop-in-Medak, Church of South India

References

2010 deaths
1942 births
Telugu people
21st-century Roman Catholic archbishops in India
20th-century Indian Roman Catholic theologians